Christophe Moulin (born 6 November 1958) is a Swiss footballer manager and former player who played as a defender.

Honours

Manager
Sion
Swiss Cup: 2005–06

References

1958 births
Living people
Swiss men's footballers
Association football defenders
FC Martigny-Sports players
FC Sion players
FC Monthey players
Swiss Super League players
Swiss football managers
FC Martigny-Sports managers
FC Stade Nyonnais managers
FC Sion managers